DXMB (95.1 FM), broadcasting as 95.1 Love Radio, is a radio station owned and operated by Manila Broadcasting Company through its licensee Cebu Broadcasting Company. Its studio and transmitter are located at the 2nd floor, Cesia Bldg., South Montilla Blvd., Butuan.

Incidents
On October 4, 2012, an obsessed listener burned down the station on its old location at the 2nd floor, Montalban Bldg. along A.D. Curato St.

References

Radio stations in Butuan
Radio stations established in 1995
Love Radio Network stations